James Walter Robinson was an English professional footballer who played as a wing half.

References

People from Ryton, Tyne and Wear
Footballers from Tyne and Wear
English footballers
Association football wing halves
Burnley F.C. players
Nelson F.C. players
Bradford City A.F.C. players
Doncaster Rovers F.C. players
Scarborough F.C. players
Newcastle United F.C. players
English Football League players
Year of birth missing
Year of death missing